DTDP-L-rhamnose 4-epimerase (dTDP-4-L-rhamnose 4-epimerase, wbiB (gene)) is an enzyme with systematic name dTDP-6-deoxy-beta-L-talose 4-epimerase. This enzyme catalyses the following chemical reaction

 dTDP-6-deoxy-beta-L-talose  dTDP-6-deoxy-beta-L-mannose

The equilibrium is strongly towards dTDP-6-deoxy-beta-L-mannose.

References

External links 
 

EC 5.1.3